Paweł Sibik (born 15 February 1971 in Niemcza) is a retired Polish professional football player. He played for clubs such as Odra Wodzisław, Ruch Chorzów, Apollon Limassol (Cyprus) and Podbeskidzie Bielsko-Biała. Sibik made three appearances for the Poland national football team during 2002, including a first round match against the USA at the 2002 FIFA World Cup.

References

External links
 

1971 births
Living people
Polish footballers
Poland international footballers
2002 FIFA World Cup players
Ekstraklasa players
Cypriot First Division players
Apollon Limassol FC players
Odra Wodzisław Śląski players
Podbeskidzie Bielsko-Biała players
Ruch Chorzów players
Polish expatriate footballers
Expatriate footballers in Cyprus
Polish expatriate sportspeople in Cyprus
Odra Wodzisław Śląski managers
People from Niemcza
Sportspeople from Lower Silesian Voivodeship
Association football midfielders
Polish football managers